"Crush" is a single released by Paul van Dyk in a collaboration with the trance duo, Second Sun.

Track listing

CD Version
 "Crush" (Extended Mix)
 "Crush" (Original Mix)
 "Crush" (Vandit Club Mix)
 "Crush" (Hyper Remix)
 "Crush" (Funk d'void Remix)
 "Crush" (Video)

12" Version
 "Crush" (Vandit Club Mix)
 "Crush" (PVD Original Mix)
 "Crush" (PVD Remix)

Charts

References

2004 songs
2004 singles
Paul van Dyk songs
Songs written by Paul van Dyk